The Romanian Handball Federation (FRH) is the governing body of handball in Romania. It is based in Bucharest. FRH is led by 6 departments.

History
 The official rules of the game are written and published by Karl Schelenz in Berlin (1919). 
 On 17 June 1921, the first game of handball takes place in Romania. The game was played at the Central Stadium Sibiu. It was organized by professor Wilhelm Binder, and the teams were two local high schools: Brukenthal High School and Girls High School.
 In 1931, Sibiu will organize the first major competition: Transylvania Cup.
 In 1933, handball is added to the existing Romanian Volleyball and Basketball Federation becoming Romanian Volleyball, Basketball and Handball Federation (FRVBH).  
 In 1934, Transylvania Cup becomes Handball National League. The league is formed from three sub-divisions based on their location: North League (Ardeal), West League (Banat) and South League (Bucharest and Ploieşti).  
 In 1936, Romanian Handball Federation is founded as an independent governing body.

Competitions
The Romanian Handball Federation organizes the following handball leagues:

 Romanian First League of Men's Handball
 Romanian First League of Women's Handball
 Division A Men's Handball
 Division A Women's Handball
 Juniors League I Men's Handball
 Juniors League I Women's Handball
 Juniors League II Men's Handball
 Juniors League II Women's Handball
 Juniors League III Men's Handball
 Juniors League III Women's Handball

It also organizes the Romania men's national handball team and the Romania women's national handball team and also Carpathian Trophy.

Presidents

References

External links
  

Handball in Romania
Romania
Sports organizations established in 1936